Universal basic income pilots are smaller-scale preliminary experiments which are carried out on selected members of the relevant population to assess the feasibility, costs and effects of the full-scale implementation of universal basic income (also called UBI), or the related concept of negative income tax, including partial universal basic income and similar programs. The following list provides an overview of the most famous universal basic income pilots, including projects which have not been launched yet but have been already approved by the respective political bodies or for the negotiations are in process.

North America

Pilots in the United States in the 1960s and 1970s 
Beginning in the end of 1960s, there were four universal basic income experiments conducted in the United States, all in the form of NITs. As Alicia H. Munnell, who was examining the experiments in Indiana, Seattle and Denver explains, a moderate reduction in work effort (17% among women, 7% among men) has been found by the American economist Gary Burtless. Munnell also mentions that the money people had received was not squandered on frivolous products such as drugs and luxury goods. In addition, there has been an increase in school attendance. However Jodie Allen remarked that work disincentive effects were large enough to suggest that as much as 50 to 60 percent of the transfers paid to two-parent families under NIT might go to replace lost earnings. No noticeable improvements to health and the overall well-being were discovered and the effect on home-ownership rates was found to be negligible as well.

Mincome in Manitoba 
A similar field experiment of the Canadian Guaranteed Annual Income (GAI), known as Mincome, took place in Dauphin, Manitoba between 1974 and 1979. According to a research into the effects of Mincome on population health, conducted by a University of Manitoba researcher Evelyn Forget in 2011, the experiment has resulted in significant reduction in hospitalization, specifically in case of mental health diagnoses. Among all the people, only two key groups were found to be discouraged from working by the Mincome project – new mothers and teenaged boys, who, instead of entering the workforce at an early age, decided to study until grade 12, increasing the proportion of students who graduate high school.

Native American casinos and tribal profit sharing 
A longitudinal study of 1,420 low income children in rural North Carolina designed to observe their mental condition had the unintended result of also measuring the effect of an unconditional cash transfer on a subset of this group. The Great Smoky Mountains Study of Youth has found that a quarter of the families belonging to the Eastern Band of Cherokee Indians have experienced a surge in annual income due to a newly built casino as during this study, a portion of profits of this casino were unconditionally distributed to all tribal members on a semi-annual basis.  Key findings of this study include lower instances of behavioural and emotional disorders among the children and improved relationship between children and their parents, as well as reduction in parental alcohol consumption.

Y Combinator 
In May 2016, Y Combinator, an American company with the aim of providing seed funding for start-up companies, announced that its non-profit arm YC Research would perform a five-year unconditional basic income study, which resembles the experiments carried out in the 1960s and 1970s, in Oakland, California.

The project was delayed by institutional review board approval at Stanford University and the University of Michigan, and work with governments to ensure recipients would not lose benefits they were already receiving. The project gave six people from Oakland $1500 per month in an initial feasibility study. Instead of the previous plan of giving 100 families $1,500 per month, by mid-2018 YC Research was hoping to get 30 to 40 people from Oakland to participate in a $50 per month trial to refine the logistics of distribution and retention of the $50 per month control group. It was planning to run three- and five-year trials in two states, not including Oakland, involving 1,000 participants randomly assigned to $1,500 per month and 2,000 randomly assigned to the $50 per month control group. The full study is expected to cost $60 million, and YC Research is waiting for fundraising to complete before starting the study.

Ontario Basic Income Pilot Project 

In Ontario, three-year basic income projects were launched in three regions from late spring to fall 2017. The participants of the project were randomly selected among resident of the regions aged 18–64, who were living on low income. The purpose of the experiment was to tackle poverty, providing people with income security while, at the same time, not discouraging them from entering the labour force. Furthermore, as poverty is believed to be one of the biggest determinants of health, the project is believed to improve health condition, which could, in turn, reduce health-care costs for the government. The pilot project was cancelled on July 31, 2018 by the newly elected Progressive Conservative government under Ontario Premier Doug Ford, with his Minister of Children, Community and Social Services Lisa MacLeod stating simply it was 'unsustainable' without citing data.

Payments to participants continued until March 2019.

Stockton, California 
In a pilot project in Stockton, California which began in February 2019, 125 residents of Stockton, California who were living at or below the median income line (around $46,000 annually) were given $500 monthly stipends, distributed through the mail in the form of debit cards, for eight months. Results evaluated in October found that most participants had been using their stipends to buy groceries and pay their bills. Around 43% of participants had a full or part-time job, only 2% were unemployed and not actively seeking work.

While critics suggest that basic income could remove the incentive to work, and this study did not find any evidence of that, one researcher noted that the two-year length of this study is not likely to be representative of continuous basic income, because when people know that income is temporary, they are unlikely to quit their jobs, although they might if basic income was permanent.

Massachusetts

A number of basic income studies are being conducted in the Boston metro area in the early 2020s, including separate studies performed by Camp Harbor View, United South End Settlements, UpTogether (with the Massachusetts Department of Transitional Assistance), and Harvard Business School.

Africa

Namibia 

In 2008, the Namibian Basic Income Grant Coalition conducted a two-year basic income pilot in the Otjivero - Omitara settlement, providing N$100 (US$7) per month to every person under the age of 60. The treatment group consisted of around 1,000 people, and a combination of panel and case studies was used to measure outcomes. After the study ended at the end of 2009, a monthly allowance of N$80 was paid to all participants until March 2012.

In 2013, due to extreme drought conditions, the Evangelical Lutheran church in Namibia provided a monthly cash grant of $100 to 6,000 individuals in four communities, modeled after the initial pilot program, from September 2013 to May 2014. In June 2014, the program restarted thanks to support from the Waldensian Church in Italy, lasting until June 2015.

Uganda
A program in Uganda randomly awarded an unsupervised grants of $382 to 535 young applicants aged 15–35. The results showed that "the program increases business assets by 57%, work hours by 17%, and earnings by 38%". In addition, many of those who participated in the project have also started their own enterprises, creating job opportunities for others. In January 2017, another pilot study, designed for two years, was launched by the charitable organization Eight in an undisclosed village consisting of 50 households. The experiment, which is being recorded in a documentary, aims to evaluate the effects of basic income in four areas: education participation of girls and women, access to healthcare, engagement in democratic institutions and local economic development. The amount of income distributed to the village residents per month is $18.25 for adults and $9.13 for children.

GiveDirectly in Kenya

GiveDirectly, one of the highest ranking charities according to GiveWell, is running the world’s largest and longest-term experiment to date studying the effects of a universal basic income.

In total, 20,000 recipients from 195 rural villages are receiving a universal basic income for a period of two or twelve years, depending on the study group they belong to. In addition, 100 villages are also part of the study as a control group. Between April and June 2020, the researchers surveyed 8,427 participants of the study groups to track the impact of the UBI during the COVID pandemic situation. Those, who received UBI were less prone to food insecurity, had a better physical and mental state, and were motivated to start a business.

Asia

Madhya Pradesh, India 
The basic income project in Madhya Pradesh, India, which started in 2010, involves 20 villages. While the villagers in eight of those got basic income, the others serve as control groups. According to the first communication of the pilot projects, positive results were found. Villages spent more on food and healthcare, children's school performance improved in 68% of families, time spent in school as well as personal savings nearly tripled and new business start-ups doubled. The study has also found an increase both in economic activity and in savings, an improvement in housing and sanitation, improved nutrition, less food poverty, improved health and schooling, greater inclusion of the disabled in society and a lack of frivolous spending. The initiative was organized in partnership with the UNICEF and SEWA and co-piloted by British researcher Guy Standing and Indian activist Renana Jhabvala with support of the economist Pranab Bardhan.

Iran 
In Autumn 2010, Iran implemented a nationwide basic income program. It is provided to all citizens and replaces subsidies for gasoline, electricity and some food items that the government has applied for the elimination of inequality and poverty for years. In 2012, the sum was approximately US $40 per person per month, US $480 per year for one person and US $2,300 for a five-person family.

Israel 
In Israel, in 2018 a non-profit initiative GoodDollar was launched, aiming to build a global economic framework for providing universal, sustainable and scalable universal basic income through new digital asset technology of blockchain. The non-profit aims to launch a peer-to-peer money transfer network in which money can be distributed to those most in need, regardless of their location, based on the principles of universal basic income. The project has raised $1 million from eToro.

Latin America

Bolsa Familia 
Bolsa Familia is a Brazilian federal anti-poverty program with strong resemblance of basic income. It consists of a cash grant, which is given to families below a certain income level, provided they meet pre-arranged conditions such as overseeing their children's school attendance. As of March 2020, the program covers 13.8 million families, and pays an average of $34 per month, in a country where the minimum wage is $190 per month.

Other similar programs are implemented in several Latin American countries, including the Oportunidades programme in Mexico.

Quatinga Velho 
Quatinga Velho is a Brazilian village in the Quatinga district of the Mogi das Cruzes municipality, which is becoming well-known for its basic income project launched in 2008 and organized by the non-profit organization ReCivitas. The funding has been entirely based on private donations so far. In June 2011, 83 villagers were given 30 Brazilian reals per person each month. The organization's objective is to eventually grant the basic income to all villagers and to get similar projects going in other villages as well, both in and outside Brazil. The organizers are currently building a social bank, so that the basic income can be financed through investments rather than donations in the future. The idea is that the bank will operate as an investment bank, but the profit will be allocated to basic income instead of a dividend to shareholders and managers.

Europe

Netherlands 
Experiments with basic income in the Netherlands are experiments with social assistance (more than basic income) as they focus on current welfare claimants. The most important experiment was called Weten wat werkt (Knowing What Works) and was a cooperation between Utrecht University and the City of Utrecht, studying "alternative approach to deliver social assistance". During the experiment, social assistance claimants were randomly divided into four groups, each of which received payments under different conditions. The aim of the study was to investigate the effects of different or fewer rules on claimants of social assistance. The experiment was supposed to be launched on 1 May 2017, but approval by the Dutch Ministry of Social Affairs and Employment was delayed. The experiment started  in June 2018 and concluded in October 2019. Results showed that there were no negative effects and some positive results for all three interventions compared to the control group. Participants increased their participation in the labour market but benefits to their health were too small to be statistically significant.

Finland 
A nationwide, two-year pilot scheme was launched in Finland on 1 January 2017. The experiment tests whether the implementation of basic universal income could help provide welfare more in line with the changing nature of work, reduce the cost and complexity of the benefits system and provide citizens with greater incentive to find work. Addressing issues caused by automation, long-term unemployment and lower wages are part of a larger social context for the experiment.

As planned, the experiment ended at the end of 2018, and the government of Finland has decided not to continue the experiment while the results of the study are analyzed. Preliminary results were released in 2019. While levels of employment did not change, it did report that those involved showed "fewer stress symptoms, fewer difficulties concentrating and fewer health problems than the control group. They were also more confident in their future and in their ability to influence societal issues." The full results of the study will come in 2020, after researchers have had time to analyse all the collected data.

The study was generally considered a failure, though many experts have stated that the experiment had many problems making its results not necessarily generalizable.

Italy 
The project is not an unconditional basic income. In January 2017, the scope of the project was extended to include another 100 families. Even though the granted sum is not as high as in case of Finland or other countries, it constitutes a huge relief for the families which are otherwise not protected at all due to the lack of unemployment benefits and minimum wage laws in Italy. The project has already inspired other Italian cities, such as Ragusa and Naples, to consider launching similar schemes as well.
In Italy, other projects of minimum guaranteed income had already been realized, much more advanced both for the amount of money and for the purposes of the Livorno project. One of these had been implemented in the Lazio Region thanks to the introduction of a law (4/2009) which in 2010 envisaged about 600 euros per month for the unemployed, particularly for women. About 10,000 people had  participated in this first phase of starting the law for the minimum guaranteed income. The subsequent regional government has not funded the law again.

Scotland 
In 2018, the Scottish Government agreed to provide  to assess the feasibility of a basic income pilot in four areas: Glasgow, Edinburgh and the regions of Fife and North Ayrshire. The feasibility study will be completed in September 2019, and the government will then decide how best to proceed with a pilot in the four areas. The Royal Society for the Encouragement of Arts, Manufactures and Commerce has also produced a report examining some of the benefits and challenges of a basic income system in the region of Fife.

Spain 

In Spain, the ingreso mínimo vital is an economic benefit guaranteed by the Social security in Spain in its modality no contributory. The IMV is defined as a "subjective right" and is intended to prevent poverty and social exclusion of people who live alone or integrated in a coexistence unit, when they are in a situation of vulnerability due to lack of sufficient financial resources to cover their basic needs.

Catalonia
The Universal Basic Income (Catalan: Renda Bàsica Universal) pilot plan is a project that the Catalan Government plans to carry out during the 2021 to 2025 term of office. In 2021, during the talks to form a government, the parliamentary agreement between the Republican Left of Catalonia (ERC) and the left-wing Popular Unity Candidacy (CUP) included a pilot plan for a universal basic income in Catalonia. 

In the Catalan pilot plan, some 5,000 people will receive the UBI. 2,500 will be randomly selected from all households in Catalonia and the remaining 2,500 will correspond to the population of two municipalities. During the two years of the pilot plants, participants will receive a monthly payment of €800 per adult and €300 per child under 18 years of age.

Germany 
In August 2020, a project in Germany started that gives a  monthly basic income to 120 citizens, which will last three years and be compared against 1,380 people who do not receive basic income.

Wales
On 14 May 2021 the Welsh Government announced its intention to pilot a UBI scheme in Wales. The First Minister Mark Drakeford said the pilot would "see whether the promises that basic income holds out are genuinely delivered" in people's lives.

References 

Universal basic income